Toulon is a city on the French Riviera and a large port on the Mediterranean coast, with a major naval base. Located in the Provence-Alpes-Côte d'Azur region, and the Provence province, Toulon is the prefecture of the Var department.

The Commune of Toulon has a population of 176,198 people (2018), making it France's 13th-largest city. It is the centre of an urban unit with 580,281 inhabitants (2018), the ninth largest in France. Toulon is the third-largest French city on the Mediterranean coast after Marseille and Nice.

Toulon is an important centre for naval construction, fishing, wine making, and the manufacture of aeronautical equipment, armaments, maps, paper, tobacco, printing, shoes, and electronic equipment.

The military port of Toulon is the major naval centre on France's Mediterranean coast, home of the French aircraft carrier Charles de Gaulle and her battle group. The French Mediterranean Fleet is based in Toulon.

History

Prehistory to the Roman era

Archaeological excavations, such as those at the Cosquer Cave near Marseille, show that the coast of Provence was inhabited since at least the Paleolithic era. Greek colonists came from Phocaea, Asia Minor, in about the 7th century BC and established trading depots along the coast, including one, called Olbia, at Saint-Pierre de l'Almanarre south of Hyères, to the east of Toulon. The Ligurians settled in the area beginning in the 4th century BC.

In the 2nd century BC, the residents of Massalia (present-day Marseille) called upon the Romans to help them pacify the region. The Romans defeated the Ligurians and began to start their own colonies along the coast. A Roman settlement was founded at the present location of Toulon, with the name Telo Martius – Telo, either for the goddess of springs or from the Latin tol, the base of the hill – and Martius, for the god of war. Telo Martius became one of the two principal Roman dye manufacturing centres, producing the purple colour used in imperial robes, made from the local sea snail called murex, and from the acorns of the oak trees. Toulon harbour became a shelter for trading ships, and the name of the town gradually changed from Telo to Tholon, Tolon, and Toulon.

Arrival of Christianity and the Counts of Provence

Toulon was Christianized in the 5th century, and the first cathedral built. Honoratus and Gratianus of Toulon (Gratien), according to the Gallia Christiana, were the first bishops of Toulon, but Louis Duchesne gives Augustalis as the first historical bishop. He assisted at councils in 441 and 442 and signed in 449 and 450 the letters addressed to Pope Leo I from the province of Arles.

A Saint Cyprian, disciple and biographer of St. Cæsarius of Arles, is also mentioned as a Bishop of Toulon. His episcopate, begun in 524, had not come to an end in 541; he converted to Catholicism two Visigothic chiefs, Mandrier and Flavian, who became anchorites and martyrs on the peninsula of Mandrier. As barbarians invaded the region and Roman power crumbled, the town was frequently attacked by pirates and the Saracens. In 1095, a new cathedral was built in the city by Count Gilbert of Provence.

Royal port (15th–18th centuries)

 

In 1486, Provence became part of France. Soon afterwards, in 1494, Charles VIII of France, with the intention of making France a sea power on the Mediterranean, and to support his military campaign in Italy, began constructing a military port at the harbor of Toulon. His Italian campaign failed, and in 1497, the rulers of Genoa, who controlled commerce on that part of the Mediterranean, blockaded the new port.

In 1524, as part of his longtime battle against Emperor Charles V and the Holy Roman Empire, King François I of France completed a powerful new fort, the Tour Royale, Toulon, at the entrance of the harbour. However, a few months later the commander of the new fort sold it to the commander of an Army of the Holy Roman Empire, and Toulon surrendered.

In 1543, Francis I found a surprising new ally in his battle against the Holy Roman Empire. He invited the fleet of Ottoman Admiral Barbarossa to Toulon as part of the Franco-Ottoman alliance. The residents were forced to leave, and the Ottoman sailors occupied the town for the winter. See Ottoman occupation of Toulon.

In 1646, a fleet was gathered in Toulon for the major Battle of Orbetello, also known as the Battle of Isola del Giglio, commanded by France's first Grand Admiral, the young Grand Admiral Marquis of Brézé, Jean Armand de Maillé-Bréze of 36 galleons, 20 galleys, and a large complement of minor vessels. This fleet carried aboard an army of 8,000 infantry and 800 cavalry and its baggage under Thomas of Savoy, shortly before a general in Spanish service.

King Louis XIV was determined to make France a major sea power. In 1660, his Minister Jean-Baptiste Colbert ordered Sébastien Le Prestre de Vauban to build a new arsenal and to fortify the town. In 1707, during the War of the Spanish Succession, Toulon successfully resisted a siege by the Imperial Army led by Duke Victor Amadeus II of Sardinia of Savoy and Prince Eugene. However, in 1720, the city was ravaged by the black plague, coming from Marseille. Thirteen thousand people, or half the population, died.

In 1790, following the French Revolution, Toulon became the administrative centre of the département of the Var. However, in 1793, the Jacobin administration of the city was swept from power, allowing Girondins and royalists to take their place; the city then rose up against the central administration of the First Republic and joined the Federalist revolts. The new Federalist administration surrendered the city and its fleet to the British. French Republican forces then undertook the siege of Toulon, forcing the British to withdraw, taking a number of ships with them and destroying the rest of them. Napoleon Bonaparte served as an artillery captain during the event. To punish Toulon for its rebellion, the town lost its status as department capital and was briefly renamed Port-de-la-Montagne.

19th century

During the Napoleonic Wars, from 1803 until 1805 a British fleet led by Admiral Horatio Nelson blockaded Toulon.

In 1820, the statue which became known as the Venus de Milo was discovered on the Greek island of Milo and seen by a French naval officer, Emile Voutier. He persuaded the French Ambassador to Turkey to buy it, and brought it to Toulon on his ship, the Estafette. From Toulon it was taken to the Louvre.

In 1820 Toulon became the base for the conquest of France's colonies in North Africa. In 1820 a French fleet with an army departed from Toulon for the conquest of Algeria.

1849, during the brief Second French Republic, Georges-Eugène Haussmann was named Prefect of the Var. During his year as prefect, he began a major reconstruction of the city, similar to what he would later do in Paris. He tore down large parts of the old fortifications and built new boulevards and squares. The new Toulon Opera House, the second-largest in France, opened in 1862.

In 1867, on the orders of Napoleon III General François Achille Bazaine arrived in Toulon without an official welcome after abandoning the Mexican military campaign and Emperor Maximilian I of Mexico.

20th century
In August 1935, a year before the reign of the Popular Front, violent uprisings of the workers of the Toulon shipyards opposed the policy of austerity. This resulted in a large number of deaths and injuries; a state of emergency was imposed.

During World War II, after the Allied landings in North Africa (Operation Torch) the German Army occupied southern France (Case Anton), leading French naval officers to scuttle the French Fleet based at Toulon on 27 November 1942. The city was bombed by the Allies in November of the following year, with much of the port destroyed and five hundred residents killed. Toulon was liberated by the Free French Forces of General Jean de Lattre de Tassigny on 28 August 1944 in the Battle of Toulon.

In 1974, Toulon became again the préfecture, or administrative centre, of the Var. Five years later the University of Toulon opened. Toulon was one of four French cities where the extreme-right Front National won the local elections in 1995. The Front National was voted out of power in 2001.

Main sights

Old Town

The old town of Toulon, the historic centre between the port, the Boulevard de Strasbourg and the Cours Lafayette, is a pedestrian area with narrow streets, small squares and many fountains. Toulon Cathedral is there. The area is also home of the celebrated Provençal market, which takes place every morning on the Cours Lafayette and features local products. The old town decayed in the 1980s and 1990s, but recently many of the fountains and squares have been restored and many new shops have opened.

Fountains of Old Toulon

The Old Town of Toulon is known for its fountains, found in many of the small squares, each with a different character. The original system of fountains was built in the late 17th century; most were rebuilt in the 18th or early 19th century and have recently been restored.

Upper Town of Georges-Eugène Haussmann

The upper town, between the Boulevard de Strasbourg and the railway station, was built in the mid-19th century under Louis Napoleon. The project was begun by Georges-Eugène Haussmann, who was prefect of the Var in 1849. Improvements to the neighbourhood included the Toulon Opera, the Place de la Liberté, the Grand Hôtel, the Gardens of Alexander I, the Chalucet Hospital, the Palais de Justice, the train station, and the building now occupied by Galeries Lafayette, among others. Haussmann went on to use the same style on a much grander scale in the rebuilding of central Paris.

Harbour and Arsenal

Toulon harbour is one of the best natural anchorages on the Mediterranean and one of the largest harbours in Europe. A naval arsenal and shipyard was built in 1599, and a small sheltered harbour, the Veille Darse, was built in 1604–1610 to protect ships from the wind and sea. The shipyard was greatly enlarged by Cardinal Richelieu, who wished to make France a Mediterranean naval power. Further additions were made by Jean-Baptiste Colbert and Vauban.

Le Mourillon

Le Mourillon is a small seaside neighbourhood to the east of Toulon, near the entrance of the harbour. It was once a fishing village, and then became the home of many of the officers of the French fleet. Mourillon has a small fishing port, next to a 16th-century fort, Fort Saint Louis, which was reconstructed by Vauban. In the 1970s the city of Toulon built a series of sheltered sandy beaches in Mourillon, which today are very popular with the Toulonais and naval families. The Museum of Asian Art is in a house on the waterfront near Fort St. Louis.

Mount Faron

Mount Faron dominates the city of Toulon. The top can be reached by cable car from Toulon or by a narrow, terrifying road that ascends from the west side and descends on the east side. The road is one of the most challenging stages of the annual Paris–Nice and Tour Méditerranéen bicycle races.

At the top of Mount Faron is a memorial dedicated to the 1944 Allied landings in Provence (Operation Dragoon), and to the liberation of Toulon.

Vauban's fortifications

Beginning in 1678, Vauban constructed an elaborate system of fortifications around Toulon. Some parts, such as the section that once ran along the present-day Boulevard de Strasbourg, were removed in the mid-19th century so the city could be enlarged, but other parts remain. One part that can be visited is the Porte d'Italie, one of the old city gates. Napoleon Bonaparte departed on his triumphant Italian campaign from this gate in 1796.

Museums
Toulon has a number of museums.

The Museum of the French Navy (Musée national de la marine) is located on Place Monsenergue, next on the west side of the old port, a short distance from the Hotel de Ville. The museum was founded in 1814, during the reign of the Emperor Napoleon. It is located today behind what was formerly the monumental gate to the Arsenal of Toulon, built in 1738. The museum building, along with the clock tower next to it, is one of the few buildings of the port and arsenal which survived Allied bombardments during World War II. It contains displays tracing the history of Toulon as a port of the French Navy. Highlights include large 18th-century ship models used to teach seamanship and models of the aircraft carrier Charles De Gaulle.

The Museum of Old Toulon and its Region (Musée du vieux Toulon et de sa région). The Museum was founded in 1912, and contains a collection of maps, paintings, drawings, models and other artifacts showing the history of the city.

The Museum of Asian Arts (Musée des arts asiatiques), in Mourillon. Located in a house with garden which once belonged to the son and later the grandson of author Jules Verne, the museum contains a small but interesting collection of art objects, many donated by naval officers from the time of the French colonization of Southeast Asia. It includes objects and paintings from India, China, Southeast Asia, China Tibet and Japan.

The Museum of Art (Musée d'art) was created in 1888, and contains collections of modern and contemporary art, as well as paintings of Provence from the 17th century to the beginning of the 20th century. It owns works by landscape artists of Provence from the late 19th century (Paul Guigou, Auguste Aiguier, Vincent Courdouan, Félix Ziem), and the Fauves of Provence (Charles Camoin, Auguste Chabaud, Louis Mathieu Verdilhan). The contemporary collections contain works from 1960 to today representing the New Realism Movement (Arman, César, Christo, Klein, Raysse); Minimalist Art (Sol LeWitt, Donald Judd); Support Surface (Cane, Viallat côtoient Arnal, Buren, Chacallis) and an important collection of photographs by Henri Cartier-Bresson, Dieuzaide, Edouard Boubat, Willy Ronis and André Kertész).

The Memorial Museum to the Landings in Provence (Mémorial du débarquement de Provence) is located on the summit of Mount Faron, this small museum, opened in 1964 by President Charles De Gaulle, commemorates the Allied landing in Provence in August 1944 with photos, weapons and models.

The Museum of Natural History of Toulon and the Var (Musée d'histoire naturelle de Toulon et du Var) was founded in 1888, has a large collection of displays about dinosaurs, birds, mammals, and minerals, mostly from the region.

The Hôtel des arts was opened in 1998, presents five exhibits a year of works by well-known contemporary artists. Featured artists have included Sean Scully, Jannis Kounellis, Claude Viallat, Per Kirkeby, and Vik Muniz.

Other points of interest
 Jardin d'acclimatation du Mourillon
 Tour Royale, Toulon

Climate

Toulon is subtropical, featuring a Mediterranean climate (Köppen climate classification: Csa), characterised by abundant and strong sunshine, dry summers, and rain which is rare but sometimes torrential; and by hot summers and mild winters. Because of its proximity to the sea, the temperature is relatively moderate.

According to data collected by Météo-France, Toulon is the city in metropolitan France with the most sunshine per year: an average of 2,856 hours a year from 1999 to 2008, compared with 2,695 hours a year for Nice and 2,472 hours for Perpignan. This is due to the wall of mountains that largely protects Toulon from the weather coming from north.

Average rainfall is 665 millimetres per year. It rains on less than 60 days per year (an average of 59.7 days) and the amount of precipitation is very unequal in the different seasons. In February, the month with the most rain, it rains 7.1 days, but with only  of rain, while in October there are 5.9 days of rain. July, with 1.3 days of rain, is usually the driest month, but the driest month can fall anywhere between May and September. Autumn is characterized by torrential but brief rains; in winter there is more precipitation, spread out over longer periods.

Because of the proximity to the sea, freezing temperatures are rare; an average of 2.9 days a year, and lasting frosts (when the maximum temperature remains less or equal to zero) are non-existent. Snow is also very rare (barely 1.5 days per year on average) and it is even more rare for the snow to last during the day (0.3 days a year on average).

One distinctive feature of the Toulon climate is the wind, with 115 days a year of strong winds; usually either the cold and dry Mistral or the Tramontane from the north, the wet Marin; or the Sirocco sometimes bearing reddish sand from Africa; or the wet and stormy Levant from the east. (See Winds of Provence.) The windiest month is January, with an average of 12.5 days of strong winds. The least windy month is September, with 7 days of strong winds. In winter, the Mistral can make the air feel extremely cold, even though the temperature is mild.

The climate is dry and the humidity in Toulon is usually low. The average humidity is 56 percent, with little variation throughout the year; the driest months are July and August with 50 percent, and the most humid months are November and December with 60 percent.

Population

Education
Toulon has a conservatory (Conservatoire TPM, part of Conservatoire à rayonnement régional de Toulon) which taught music, theater, dance and circus and an art academy called École supérieure d'art et de design Toulon Provence Méditerranée. Toulon is also home to a number of institutes of the University of Toulon, known until 2013 as University of the South, Toulon-Var. Toulon has a campus of KEDGE Business School.

Literature
Toulon figures prominently in Victor Hugo's Les Misérables. It is the location of the infamous prison, the bagne of Toulon, in which the protagonist Jean Valjean spends nineteen years in hard labour. Toulon is also the birthplace of the novel's antagonist, Javert. One portion of the wall of the old bagne, or prison, where Jean Valjean was supposedly held still stands to the right of the entrance of the Old Harbour.

In Anthony Powell's novel What's Become of Waring the central characters spend a long summer holiday in Toulon's old town. Powell himself stayed at the Hotel du Port et des Negociants on two occasions in the early 1930s and writes in the second volume of his memoirs The naval port, with its small inner harbour, row of cafés along the rade, was quite separate from the business quarter of the town. A paddle steamer plied several times a day between this roadstead and the agreeably unsophisticated plage of Les Sablettes.

Joseph Conrad's last novel, The Rover, is also set around Toulon.

The last half of Dewey Lambdin's historical fiction novel, H.M.S. Cockerel, (the sixth novel in his Alan Lewrie naval adventure series) details the Siege of Toulon from Lewrie's perspective, as he commands a commandeered French barge carrying sea mortars against Lieutenant-Colonel Bonaparte's forces.

Transport

Toulon is served by the Gare de Toulon railway station, offering suburban services to Marseille (1 train every 15minutes during rush hour), Nice, Paris and regional destinations. The port of Toulon is the main port of departure for ferries to Corsica. The nearest airport is the regional Toulon-Hyères Airport. The A50 autoroute connects Toulon to Marseille, the A57 autoroute runs from Toulon to Le Luc, where it connects to the A8 autoroute.

Gastronomy
Local food highlights include:
cuisine from the Mediterranean and from Provence
the cade toulonnaise, a local speciality composed of chickpea flour and which is equivalent to the Socca of Nice
the Chichi Frégi, a type of donut from Provence.
Smash Sandwiches, a common sandwich available from street vendors throughout Toulon.

Sport
The most successful of the city's clubs are the rugby union team RC Toulon and the women's handball team Toulon St-Cyr Var Handball, both playing in the top division of their respective sports. The basketball team Hyères-Toulon Var Basket play in the second division of the French championship.

The city hosts the final four of the annual Toulon Tournament, an international under-21 football tournament.

Toulon's main football team is Sporting Club Toulon, which plays in Championnat National, the third level of French football. Famous players such as Delio Onnis, Jean Tigana, Christian Dalger, David Ginola and Sébastien Squillaci have all played for Sporting.

The city has been chosen by Groupama Team France as the venue for the fifth event in the Americas Cup World Series 2016, alongside international cities such as Portsmouth & New York.

Notable residents
Toulon is the birthplace of:
Jean Joseph Marie Amiot (1718–1793), Jesuit
Gilbert Bécaud (1927–2001), singer
Boris Bede (born 1989), gridiron football player
Jean Blondel (born 1929), political scientist
Jacques Borsarello (born 1951), violist
Robert Busnel (1914–1991), basketball player
Capucine, actress
François Étienne Victor de Clinchamp (1787–1880), painter and author
Émile Colonne (1885–1990), operatic baritone
Lúcio Costa (1902–1998), architect and urban planner
Mireille Darc (1938–2017), actress
Kaba Diawara (born 1975), footballer
Laurent Emmanuelli (born 1976), rugby union prop, returning to play for RC Toulon in 2009–10
Matar Fall (born 1982), footballer
Henri Ghys (1839–1908), composer and pianist
Anne Golon (1921–2017), author, wrote a series of novels about a heroine Angélique
Josuha Guilavogui, footballer
Guy du Merle (1908–1993), aeronautical engineer, test pilot and writer
Loïc Jean-Albert (born 1978), expert parachuter
Maryse Joissains-Masini (born 1942), Mayor of Aix-en-Provence
Jacques Le Goff (1924–2014), historian
Ève Lavallière (1866–1929), stage actress 
Félix Mayol (1972–1941), singer and entertainer, and namesake of RC Toulon's stadium
Alain Mucchielli (born 1947), physician
Sabine Paturel (born 1965), singer and actress
Gabriel Péri (1902–1941), journalist and politician
LiLi Roquelin, singer-songwriter
Raimu (1883–1946), actor
Brigitte Roüan (born 1946), film director and actress
Bastien Salabanzi (born 1985), professional skateboarder
Cyril Saulnier (born 1975), tennis player
Sébastien Squillaci (born 1980), French International footballer
Didier Tarquin (born 1967), cartoonist and scenarist
Charles Thanaron (1809–1886), capitaine de frégate in the French Navy, member of the Dumont d'Urville second expedition
Jean Tournier (1926–2004), cinematographer
Joëlle Wintrebert (born 1949), writer

International relations

Toulon is twinned with:

La Spezia, Italy, since 1958
Mannheim, Germany, since 1958
Norfolk, United States, since 1988
Kronstadt, Russia, since 1996

See also
Communes of the Var department
Rafiot - a type of fishing vessel from Toulon

References

Bibliography

 Michel Vergé-Franceschi, Toulon – Port Royal (1481–1789). Tallandier: Paris, 2002.
Aldo Bastié, Histoire de la Provence, Editions Ouest-France, 2001.
Cyrille Roumagnac, L'Arsenal de Toulon et la Royale, Editions Alan Sutton, 2001
Jean-Pierre Thiollet, Le Chevallier à découvert, Paris, Laurens, 1998
 Maurice Arreckx, Vivre sa ville, Paris, La Table ronde, 1982; Toulon, ma passion, 1985

Notes

External links

Toulon : between military tradition and touristic modernity – Official French website (in English)
Official website
The Tourism Office of Toulon web site

 
Communes of Var (department)
Prefectures in France
Vauban fortifications in France
Cities in France